Patcharee Sangmuang (born 20 March 1978, Nakhon Ratchasima, Thailand) is the captain of the Thai women's national volleyball team, who made her international debut in the 13th Asian Games in Bangkok, Thailand. Her nickname is Toy

Career
Patcharee played with the Filipino team Adamson Lady Falcons in 2014 and with Thai club Maejo Cosmo Chiangrai in the 2015–16 season. She also played with the Filipino club Philippine Air Force in 2017.

Clubs
  Fujian Xi Meng Bao (2004)
  Aurum (2005)
  Vietnam (2006–2008)
  Suan Sunandha (2011–2012) 
  Ayutthaya (2012–2013)
  Colegio de San Juan de Letran (2012)
  Cagayan Valley Lady Rising Suns (2013)
  Adamson Lady Falcons (2014)
  Cagayan Valley Lady Rising Suns (2014)
  Bangkok (2014–2015)
  Maejo Cosmo Chiangrai (2015–2016)
  Thai-Denmark Nongrua (2016–2017)
  Philippine Air Force (2017)
  Cosmo Chiangrai (2017)
  Chooks-to-Go Tacloban Fighting Warays (2018)
  Opart 369 (2019)

References

1978 births
Patcharee Sangmuang
Living people
Volleyball players at the 2002 Asian Games
Volleyball players at the 2006 Asian Games
Patcharee Sangmuang
Southeast Asian Games medalists in volleyball
Universiade medalists in volleyball
Competitors at the 1997 Southeast Asian Games
Competitors at the 2001 Southeast Asian Games
Competitors at the 2003 Southeast Asian Games
Competitors at the 2005 Southeast Asian Games
Competitors at the 2007 Southeast Asian Games
Universiade bronze medalists for Thailand
Patcharee Sangmuang
Patcharee Sangmuang
Patcharee Sangmuang
Patcharee Sangmuang